Randana is the First album by Le Trio Joubran, released  in 2005 labelled "daquí", by Harmonia Mundi.
The album title comes from the contraction of the words Ranna meaning "resonance" and Dandana meaning "hum".

Track listing
 "Hawas" - 6:08
 "Misage" - 4:57
 "Shagaf" - 9:07
 "Safar" - 18:08
 "Ahwak (Live In Ramallah)" - 6:48

Musicians
 Samir Joubran, oud, voice
 Wissam Joubran, oud
 Adnan Joubran, oud

2005 albums
Le Trio Joubran albums